NGC 500 (also known as PGC 5013) is a type E-SO lenticular galaxy located in the Pisces constellation. It has an apparent size of .8 by .6 arcminutes and an apparent magnitude of 14.2. It was first discovered in 1850 by Bindon Blood Stoney during his time at Birr Castle in Ireland.

See also 
 Lenticular galaxy 
 List of NGC objects (1–1000)
 Pisces (constellation)

References

External links 
 
 
 SEDS

0500
Lenticular galaxies
Pisces (constellation)
Discoveries by Bindon Blood Stoney
Discoveries by William Parsons, 3rd Earl of Rosse
005013